Heljo is an Estonian feminine given name.

As of 1 January 2021, 324 women in Estonia have the first name Heljo, making it the 396th most popular female name in the country. The name is most commonly found in Jõgeva County, where 4.60 per 10,000 inhabitants of the county bear the name.   

People with the name include:

Heljo Mänd (1926–2020), Estonian children's writer, novelist, newspaper editor and poet
Heljo Pikhof (born 1958), Estonian politician
Heljo Sepp (1922–2015), Estonian pianist, music teacher and emeritus professor 
Heljo Tamet (1922–1974), Estonian folk dance pedagogue

References

Feminine given names
Estonian feminine given names